Erika Rose Alexander (born November 19, 1969) is an American actress, writer, producer, entrepreneur and activist best known for her roles as Pam Tucker on the NBC sitcom The Cosby Show (1990–1992), and Maxine Shaw on the FOX sitcom Living Single (1993–1998). She has won numerous awards for her work on Living Single, including two NAACP Image Awards for Outstanding Actress in a Comedy Series. Her film credits include The Long Walk Home (1990), 30 Years to Life (2001), Déjà Vu (2006) and Get Out (2017).

Early life
Alexander was born in Winslow, Arizona and raised in Flagstaff, Arizona until the age of eleven, when she and her family moved to Philadelphia, Pennsylvania. She is one of six children born to Robert and Sammie Alexander, a school teacher and children's book author. Alexander graduated from Philadelphia High School for Girls.

Acting career
After graduating from high school, Alexander enrolled in a six-week acting class at the New Freedom Theatre. During the fifth week, Alexander got a major role in her first film. Alexander made her film debut appearing in the independent drama My Little Girl in 1986. In 1989, Alexander played the role of Hidimbi in Peter Brook's miniseries adaptation of The Mahabharata. She got her big break starring opposite Whoopi Goldberg in the 1990 civil rights epic drama film The Long Walk Home.

Alexander performed in the play The Forbidden City with Gloria Foster, who then talked about her with her friend, Camille Cosby, wife of Bill Cosby. She later was cast as Pam Tucker on the NBC sitcom The Cosby Show starring from 1990 to series finale in 1992. Alexander later went to star in the ABC comedy-drama series Going to Extremes, which centered on a group of American students at a medical school on a fictitious Caribbean island named Jantique. The series was canceled after one season in 1993.

In 1993, Alexander began starring as the acid-tongued attorney Maxine Shaw in the Fox sitcom Living Single, a role she played for five years to 1998. For this role, she won two NAACP Image Award for Outstanding Actress in a Comedy Series in 1996 and 1998. She appeared in Toni Braxton's music video for "You're Makin' Me High" in 1996. In 1998, she starred opposite Cicely Tyson in the CBS miniseries Mama Flora's Family with her former Living Single co-star Queen Latifah. based on novel by Alex Haley, and well as appeared in the drama film 54. In 2001, she starred in the comedy film 30 Years to Life receiving Black Reel Award for Best Independent Actress for her performance.

In 2002, Alexander returned to television playing probation officer Dee Mulhern in the Showtime drama series Street Time, which ran for two seasons.  She had recurring roles in Judging Amy, In Plain Sight, Low Winter Sun and Let's Stay Together. Alexander also guest-starred on Law & Order: Special Victims Unit, Half and Half, ER, CSI: Crime Scene Investigation, Criminal Minds, House, Suits and Grey's Anatomy. From 2012 to 2015, she had a recurring role as Carol Larabee, Mike and Vanessa's neighbor, in the ABC comedy series Last Man Standing. Tisha Campbell-Martin replaced her in this role in the seventh season.

Alexander appeared in a number of films during the 2000s and 2010s. In 2006 she played the role of Shanti, a technical science engineer in the science fiction action film Deja Vu opposite Denzel Washington. She starred opposite Benjamin Bratt and Jeremy Ray Valdez. in the 2009 drama film La Mission, and in 2014 had supporting role in the comedy-drama Elsa & Fred starring Shirley MacLaine and Christopher Plummer. In 2017 she played Detective Latoya in the critically acclaimed horror film Get Out.

From 2016 to 2017, Alexander starred as Constance Irving in the Amazon original drama, Bosch. She had a recurring roles in the Oprah Winfrey Network drama series Queen Sugar in 2016 and Freeform fantasy drama Beyond from 2017 to 2018. In 2018, she was cast in a recurring role as Perenna in the CW superhero series Black Lightning. In 2019, she received NAACP Image Award nomination for Outstanding Guest Performance in a Comedy or Drama Series. Later in 2019, she began starring in the Hulu drama series, Wu-Tang: An American Saga.

Writing career
In 2012, she co-created and co-wrote Concrete Park, a science-fiction graphic novel with then-husband Tony Puryear. In 2018 she penned season eleven of the Buffy the Vampire Slayer comic Giles alongside Buffy creator Joss Whedon.

Personal life
In 1997, Alexander married artist/screenwriter Tony Puryear, but they divorced in 2017.She actively campaigned for Hillary Clinton and toured college campuses with Chelsea Clinton, during the 2008 Democratic Party primary. She is a co-founder (with Ben Arnon) of Color Farm Media, an entertainment, innovation, and social impact company. In 2020, Color Farm Media released the critically acclaimed documentary John Lewis: Good Trouble, focusing on civil rights leader John Lewis.

Filmography

Film

Television

Awards and nominations

References

External links
 

1969 births
Living people
Actresses from Arizona
Actresses from Philadelphia
People from Winslow, Arizona
African-American actresses
American television actresses
Philadelphia High School for Girls alumni
21st-century African-American people
21st-century African-American women
20th-century African-American people
20th-century African-American women